The Molenbeek (English: Millbrook) is a brook in the Denderstreek, Belgium. The stream has a length of approximately 22 kilometers. The source of the Molenbeek is located in Grotenberge and the delta is in nearby Wichelen. This brook is not to be confused with the Molenbeek-Ter Erpenbeek which is also in Erpe-Mere (and Herzele).

Basin
The basin of the Molenbeek is located in the province of East Flanders, and flows through the municipalities of Wichelen (Schellebelle, Serskamp, Wichelen), Lede (Wanzele, Impe, Smetlede, Papegem, Lede, and Oordegem), Erpe-Mere (Erondegem, Vlekkem, Ottergem, Bambrugge, Egem, and Burst) and Herzele (Borsbeke, Herzele, Ressegem, and Hillegem).
The south of the basin comprises a small part of the Zottegem municipality (Grotenberge and Leeuwergem). In the west, it crosses the border of the Sint-Lievens-Houtem territory (Vlierzele, Zonnegem, Letterhoutem).

The Molenbeek is part of the Drie Molenbeken drainage basin. The Drie Molenbeken are tributaries of the Bovenschelde. The Bovenschelde is a part of the river Scheldt. The basin of the Molenbeek has an area of approximately 5276 hectares, and is located in the basin of the Bovenschelde. The Molenbeek goes through the Bovenschelde near to Wichelen.

From its source in Grotenberge to the delta nearby, Wichelen of the Molenbeek has the following tributaries: Valleibeek, Fonteinbeek, Doormansbeek, Kasteelgracht, Hellegat, Smoorbeek, Kokelaarsbeek, Zijpbeek, Trotgracht, Overimpebeek, Beekveldzijp, Wellebeek, and Vijverbeek.

Mills
In the municipality of Erpe-Mere, there are three mills on the Molenbeek. One mill is protected by law, while another has been largely demolished, but there are still remains of this mill, and the mill house itself is still intact.

External links
 Map drainage basin: the Drie Molenbeken

Erpe-Mere
Herzele
Lede, Belgium
Sint-Lievens-Houtem
Wichelen
Zottegem
Rivers of East Flanders
Rivers of Belgium